The British Columbia Historical Federation encourages interest in the history of British Columbia through research, presentation, and support.

The Federation provides a collective voice for its member societies.

History
The British Columbia Historical Association was established on October 12, 1922, and on March 2, 1927, the Association was registered under the Societies Act. It was renamed the British Columbia Historical Federation on July 29, 1983 — a name that better reflects its role as an umbrella organization for provincial historical societies. The Federation is a nonprofit organization registered as a charitable society under the Income Tax Act.

Publications
The British Columbia Historical Federation publishes a bi-monthly newsletter and articles on its website. Its quarterly magazine, British Columbia History, is dedicated solely to the history of the province of British Columbia.

In 1923 the British Columbia Historical Association published its First Annual Report and Proceedings, edited by Walter Noble Sage. In 1937, it evolved into the British Columbia Historical Quarterly edited by W.K. Lamb. After a 10 year hiatus, the British Columbia Historical News appeared in the spring of 1968. Early issues included news from member societies and of local historical interest as well as a feature article. As the journal matured it published fewer news items and more feature articles, so to reflect this change the title was revised to British Columbia History in 2005. All of these publications from 1923 to 2015 have now been digitized and made available to researchers online through a partnership with UBC Library. British Columbia History is a member of the Magazine Association of British Columbia.

K. Jane Watt is the current Managing Editor of British Columbia History magazine, guest editors are now brought on for each issue.

BCHF Buzz
In order to provide timely information to member societies, the British Columbia Historical Federation newsletter has been issued since June 2003. 42 issues of the newsletter were edited and produced by Ron Hyde from 2003 to 2013. The newsletter is now delivered electronically. The BCHF Buzz provides monthly information and is a forum for member societies to publicize events and activities. The BCHF Buzz is emailed to all BCHF members. Greg Nesteroff is the editor.

Presidents

External links
 Official website
 British Columbia History
 Magazine Association of British Columbia

References

Organizations based in British Columbia